This is a list of current and past Honorary Fellows of St Hilda's College, Oxford.

 Mildred Archer
 Mary Bennett
 Marilyn Butler
 Elizabeth Butler-Sloss, Baroness Butler-Sloss
 Fiona Caldicott
 Lorna Casselton
 Jacqueline du Pré
 Lucy Faithfull, Baroness Faithfull
 Janet Gaymer
 Susan Greenfield
 P. D. James
 Gwyneth Jones
 Elizabeth Topham Kennan
 Hermione Lee
 Nicola LeFanu
 Mary Lefkowitz
 Toni Morrison
 Gillian Shephard
 Rosalyn Tureck

See also 

 :Category:Alumni of St Hilda's College, Oxford
 :Category:Fellows of St Hilda's College, Oxford

Honorary
Lists of Honorary Fellows of colleges of the University of Oxford